The Font Roja Natural Park is a natural park situated in Alcoy, in the autonomous community of Valencia, Spain.

The Font Roja natural park was declared on April 13, 1987 natural park by the Generalitat Valenciana. It is located in the comarca of Alcoià, in the North of the province of Alicante, between the towns of Alcoy and Ibi. This natural park is one of the best preserved natural areas of the Valencian Community. The protected natural area covers 2.298 hectares and comprises mountainous alignment of El Alto de San Antonio (L'Alt de Sant Antoni), El Carrascar of the Font Roja (El Carrascar de la Font Roja) and La Teixereta. The summit of the Sierra del Menejador, with 1,356 m of height, is the highest elevation of the park.

See also 

Serra Mariola Natural Park
Barchell Castle

External links

Font Roja Natural Park (Spanish, Valencian)

Alcoy
Green Spain
Natural parks of Spain
Natural parks of the Valencian Community
Protected areas of the Valencian Community
Protected areas established in 1987
Font Roja
Geography of the Province of Alicante
Font Roja